General Seregni (former Colonia Nicolich) is a town in the Canelones Department of southern Uruguay.

Colonia Nicolich is also the name of the municipality to which the town belongs and which includes the areas Colinas de Carrasco (Empalme) and Villa Aeroparque.

Geography
The town is located directly north and northeast of the Carrasco International Airport on Route 102. It is part of the wider metropolitan area of Montevideo.

History
Since the 19th century, the area has been characterized by intensive agriculture supplying the markets of Montevideo. In the 1940s a slow urbanization started taking place. The urbanization was accelerated in the 1970s making it part of the metropolitan area of Montevideo. This included the construction of housing complexes for the Air Force personnel serving at nearby Air Base N1 and for those studying at the also nearby Aeronautic Military School. Other settlements were added in the 1990s. Today Colonia Nicolich is considered a typical "dormitory town" for people who commute daily to Montevideo for work or business.

In the mid-20th century a Mennonite colony was established there.

Since 1999 there is a private cemetery nearby, Parque Martinelli de Carrasco.

Population
In 2011 Colonia Nicolich had a population of 9,624. The Intendencia de Canelones had estimated a population of 13,757 for the municipality, based on the 2004 census.
 
Source: Instituto Nacional de Estadística de Uruguay

Places of worship
 Parish Church of St. Francis of Assisi (Roman Catholic)

References

External links
INE map of Colonia Nicolich, Paso Carrasco, Carrasco Int.Airport, and parts of the municipality of Ciudad de la Costa

Populated places in the Canelones Department
Mennonitism in Uruguay